Daik is the main village (kelurahan) on the island of Lingga of Lingga Regency, in the Riau archipelago in Indonesia.

History
Daik was the capital of the Lingga Sultanate for almost 100 years, from 1819 to 1911.

Climate
Daik has a tropical rainforest climate (Af) with heavy rainfall year-round.

References

Populated places in the Riau Islands
Regency seats of the Riau Islands